White diamond may refer to:

 a white diamond

Entertainment
 White Diamond: A Personal Portrait of Kylie Minogue, a 2007 documentary film directed by fashion designer William Baker
 The White Diamond, a 2004 documentary film by Werner Herzog
 "White Diamond" a song recorded by Kylie Minogue from the 2007 album X (Kylie Minogue album) 
 White Diamond (a hard rock/heavy metal band) with Ian Stuart Donaldson
 White Diamond, a character in the television series Steven Universe

Other uses
 White Diamonds, a fragrance by Elizabeth Taylor